St Joseph's Hurling Club (Cumann Iomána Naomh Iosaf) was founded in 1995, bringing Gaelic games to the people of Silicon Valley. The club's men's teams have won six hurling titles, two Gaelic football titles, and the women's Gaelic football team winning their championship in 1999.

After the 2002 season, the club was disbanded. A later increase in the area's Irish population resulted in the club being reformed in time for the 2012 hurling season. Success followed in the 2014 season with St. Joseph's winning the Western Division Junior Championship and North American Junior B Championship. St. Joseph's went on to retain their Western Division Junior Championship in 2015.

Although many of the players are locally settled Irish, St. Joseph's also seeks other players from the area. Nearby Stanford University has a collegiate hurling team and has close ties with St. Joseph's.

The club is affiliated to the Western Division Board, an affiliate of the North American GAA.

Notable players
 Pat Fox, Tipperary and Éire Óg Annacarty Hurler.
 Kevin Hartnett, Cork and Russell Rovers Hurler, All-Ireland Hurling Winner.

Irish-American culture in California
Irish-American organizations